The 1902 New Zealand general election was held on Tuesday, 25 November, in the general electorates, and on Monday, 22 December in the Māori electorates to elect a total of 80 MPs to the 15th session of the New Zealand Parliament. A total number of 415,789 (76.7%) voters turned out to vote.

The Rev Frank Isitt was nominated as the Prohibitionist candidate for ten separate electorates, and came second in eight. Another candidate, David Whyte, was nominated for two. Both men stood to ensure that a local liquor licensing poll was held in each electorate for which they were nominated.

1902 electoral redistribution
The Representation Act 1900 had increased the membership of the House of Representatives from general electorates 70 to 76, and this was implemented through the 1902 electoral redistribution. In 1902, changes to the country quota affected the three-member electorates in the four main centres. The tolerance between electorates was increased to ±1,250 so that the Representation Commissions (since 1896, there had been separate commissions for the North and South Islands) could take greater account of communities of interest. These changes proved very disruptive to existing boundaries.

This boundary redistribution resulted in the abolition of three electorates:
, held by Richard Meredith
, held by Thomas Wilford
, held by Thomas Mackenzie

Results
Frank Isitt, a Methodist minister, stood in ten seats as a Prohibition candidate, and came second in eight.

Party totals

Votes summary

Electorate results
The following are the results of the 1902 general election:

Key

 Liberal–Labour

|-
 |colspan=8 style="background-color:#FFDEAD" | General electorates
|-

|-
 | rowspan=3 | Auckland, City of 
 | style="background-color:;" |
 | style="text-align:center;" | William Joseph Napier
 | style="background-color:;" |
 | style="text-align:center;background-color:;" | Alfred Kidd
 | style="text-align:right;" | 934
 | style="background-color:;" |
 | style="text-align:center;" | William Richardson
|-
 | style="background-color:;" |
 | colspan=3 style="text-align:center;background-color:;" | Joseph Witheford
 | style="text-align:right;" | 1,515
 | style="background-color:;" |
 | style="text-align:center;" | William Joseph Napier
|-
 | style="background-color:;" |
 | style="text-align:center;" | George Fowlds
 | style="background-color:;" |
 | style="text-align:center;background-color:;" | Frederick Baume
 | style="text-align:right;" | 2,282
 | style="background-color:;" |
 | style="text-align:center;" | Arthur Rosser
|-

|-
 | rowspan=3 | Christchurch, City of 
 | style="background-color:;" |
 | style="text-align:center;" | George John Smith
 | style="background-color:;" |
 | style="text-align:center;background-color:;" | Tommy Taylor
 | style="text-align:right;" | 899
 | style="background-color:;" |
 | style="text-align:center;" | William Whitehouse Collins
|-
 | style="background-color:;" |
 | colspan=3 style="text-align:center;background-color:;" | Harry Ell
 | style="text-align:right;" | 901
 | style="background-color:;" |
 | style="text-align:center;" | George John Smith
|-
 | style="background-color:;" |
 | style="text-align:center;" | William Whitehouse Collins
 | style="background-color:;" |
 | style="text-align:center;background-color:;" | Thomas Davey
 | style="text-align:right;" | 2,233
 | style="background-color:;" |
 | style="text-align:center;" | Arthur Hughes Turnbull
|-

|-
 | rowspan=4 | Dunedin, City of 
 | style="background-color:;" |
 | style="text-align:center;" | Alfred Richard Barclay
 | style="background-color:;" |
 | style="text-align:center;background-color:;" | Harry Bedford
 | rowspan=2 style="text-align:right;" | 1,321
 | rowspan=2 style="background-color:;" |
 | rowspan=2 style="text-align:center;" | Alfred Richard Barclay
|-
 | rowspan=2 style="background-color:;" |
 | rowspan=2 colspan=3 style="text-align:center;background-color:;" | John A. Millar
|-
 | rowspan=2 style="text-align:right;" | 3,775
 | rowspan=2 style="background-color:;" |
 | rowspan=2 style="text-align:center;" | R Chisholm
|-
 | style="background-color:;" |
 | colspan=3 style="text-align:center;background-color:;" | James Arnold
|-

|-
 | rowspan=3 | Wellington, City of 
 | style="background-color:;" |
 | style="text-align:center;" | John Hutcheson
 | style="background-color:;" |
 | style="text-align:center;background-color:;" | John Aitken
 | style="text-align:right;" | 380
 | style="background-color:" |
 | style="text-align:center;" | Patrick O'Regan
|-
 | style="background-color:;" |
 | style="text-align:center;" | Arthur Atkinson
 | style="background-color:;" |
 | style="text-align:center;background-color:;" | John Duthie
 | style="text-align:right;" | 591
 | style="background-color:" |
 | style="text-align:center;" | Arthur Atkinson
|-
 | style="background-color:;" |
 | colspan=3 style="text-align:center;background-color:;" | George Fisher
 | style="text-align:right;" | 1,921
 | style="background-color:" |
 | style="text-align:center;" | John Findlay
|-

|-
 |colspan=8 style="background-color:#FFDEAD" | Māori electorates
|-

|}

Notes

Footnotes

References